The Sudhanoti District (also spelled Sudhanuti District), meaning the "heartland of Sudhans" or "Sudhan heartland"), is one of the 10 districts of Pakistan's dependent territory of Azad Kashmir. The Sudhanoti District is bounded on the north and east by the Poonch District, on the south by the Kotli District, and on the west by the Rawalpindi District of Pakistan's Punjab Province. It is connected with Rawalpindi and Islamabad via the Azad Pattan Road.

The district headquarters is the town of Pallandri. It is at an elevation of 1,372 meters and is at a distance of 97 kilometers from Rawalpindi via the Azad Pattan Road. Pallandri is connected to Rawalakot by a 64-km metaled road.

History 
The word Sudhanoti literally means "heartland of Sudhans" Sudhan (tribe) Noti (heartland).

Sudhanoti, whose first name was Bhan Ya (Brahman) who was defeated by the Pashtun Sadozai invaders in the thirteenth century AD defeated the Bhagar Rajputs and named it Sudhanoti. The state of Sudhanoti is one of the former ten states of Jammu and Kashmir, Its history is approximately one thousand twelve hundred years old which Sudhanoti was ruled by Brahmins from 830 to 1105 AD.

The Brahman Raj was invaded by the Rajputs of hill Punjab in 1005 and captured Sudhanoti in 1105, The Bhagar Rajputs ruled Sudhanoti from 1105 to 1360. The Bhagar Rajputs were then attacked by the Afghan chief named Nawab Jassi Khan in 1360 AD, defeating them and establishing their own Sadozai government.

The Sadozai tribe ruled Sudhanoti from 1360 to 1837, Sudhanoti which from 800 to 1837 was called the fully independent state of Sudhanoti, came to an end in the Third Sikh Sudhanoti War, in which fifty to thirty thousand Sadozai people were killed. The Sikh Khalsa merged with the state of Poonch and brought it under the control of the Lahore government.

Later from 1940 to 1947 it was a tehsil of Jammu province, Thereafter in 1947 Sudhanoti became the capital of the Azad Kashmir Revolutionary Government, which was the capital of the Azad Kashmir Revolutionary Government from 1947 to 1949.

After that in 1960 Sudhanoti was divided into four districts and Sudhanoti was made a district

 Cultural Heritage Sudhanoti
Fort In Pune
Fort Bharand
Fort Barel
Fort Mandhol

Administrative divisions
The Sudhanoti District is divided into four tehsils:

 Baloch Tehsil
 Mang Tehsil
 Pallandri Tehsil
 Trarkhel Tehsil

Population
Sudhanoti has a population of 297,584 according to the 2017 Census.

The main native language is Pahari, spoken by an estimated 95% of the population.

Education
According to the Alif Ailaan Pakistan District Education Rankings 2017, Sudhanoti is ranked 34 out of 155 districts with a score of 68.85 in terms of education. For facilities and infrastructure, the district is ranked last with the very low score of 6.76.

Educational institutes include:
 
 
Mirpur University of Science & Technology (MUST) Pallandri campus, Sudhanoti District
Mohi-ud-Din Islamic University Nerian Sharif, a chartered university situated 125 km west of Islamabad 
University of Poonch (SM campus, Mang, Sudhanoti District)

Notable people
 
 
Kiran Imran Dar, Member National Assembly (MNA) Pakistan 
 Aziz Khan, General of the Pakistan Army and Chairman of the Joint Chiefs of Staff Committee
 Khan Muhammad Khan, Politician and the Chairman of the War Council during the 1947 Poonch Rebellion
 Dr. Muhammad Najeeb Naqi Khan, Minister for Health and Finance. He was elected as a member of the Azad Kashmir Legislative Assembly five times (in 1991, 1996, 2006, 2011, and 2016) from the Pallandri constituency and was a member of the Kashmir Council from 2001 to 2006.
Muhammad Alauddin Siddiqui was a great Islamic Sufi Scholar and 2nd custodian of Nerian Sharif, Tarar Khel. He died on 3 Feb 2017.

See also
Balouch, Azad Kashmir

References

External links
Government of Azad Jammu and Kashmir

 
Districts of Azad Kashmir